The Korea women's national ice hockey team is a representative side which is composed of players from both South Korea and North Korea.

The team competed at the 2018 Winter Olympics, competing as "Korea" under the IOC country code "COR".

History
In 2014, it was confirmed that Korea women's national ice hockey team had qualified to participate at the 2018 Winter Olympics as part of the host country. Their participation at the 2018 Winter Olympics had been their second appearance following their debut in the 1998 Olympics in Nagano, Japan.

South Korea had proposed a unified team of the two Koreas at the Games. It was proposed that the team would participate at least in the women's ice hockey event and possibly more disciplines. The proposal came after North Korea competed in the Group A tournament of IIHF Women's World Championship Division II which was hosted in South Korea in April 2017. North Korea initially refused the proposal in June 2017 on the grounds of time constraints. However, an agreement was made with four weeks left before the Games commenced.

On 20 January 2018, the International Olympic Committee allowed a Unified Korean team to compete in the women's ice hockey event for the 2018 Winter Olympics under the "Olympic Korean Peninsula Declaration", allowing the team to compete as "Korea", using the acronym "COR". On 30 January 2018, the full roster of the unified Korean team was named.

The language difference of Korean spoken by players from South and North Korea became a challenge for the team during training. South and North Korea use different terminology in ice hockey and head coach Sarah Murray does not speak Korean and had to rely on her assistant and manager to communicate with the team's players.

The unified team played their first friendly match against Sweden on 4 February 2018 at the Seonhak International Ice Rink in Incheon before an audience of 3,000 people ahead of the Winter Olympics. They lost 1–3 to their European opposition. The Koreans scored their only goal during the first period. Four of the 22 players in the roster for that game were North Koreans.

Team image

The anthem which plays when the Korea team plays in international ice hockey is the folk song "Arirang" instead of the national anthems of either South Korea or North Korea. The team's uniform features the silhouette of the Korean peninsula with the text "Korea".

There was some opposition to the formation of the team. Critics of the unified team believed that the team had less chance to win a medal compared to a team solely composed of South Koreans.

Olympic Games record
2018 – Finished in 8th place

Fixtures and results

Exhibition games

2018 Winter Olympics
Preliminary round – Group B

5–8th place semifinal

Seventh place game

Team

2018 Winter Olympics roster
The squad had a total of 35 players, more than other competing national teams at the Games although the IOC has mandated that only 22 players could play in each match "with respect to fair play" and that the coach must select at least three North Koreans to form the squad in each game.

All-time record against other nations
Last match update: 20 February 2018

See also
Korea at the 2018 Winter Olympics
Unified Korean sporting teams

References

Women's national ice hockey teams in Asia
Ice hockey in South Korea
Ice hockey in North Korea
Women's sport in Korea
2018 establishments in South Korea
ice hockey